Carludovica elegans is a species of flowering plants in the family Cyclanthaceae. It is found in Peru.

References

External links 

 data about WAG.1887968 specimen (Carludovica elegans Williams, 1917) at Naturalis Biodiversity Center, the Netherlands
 Carludovica elegans at Tropicos

Cyclanthaceae
Plants described in 1906
Flora of Peru